Preston Peak (Karuk: keech'íihyan), is a dominant feature of the Siskiyou Wilderness in the Klamath National Forest in northern California, U.S. Many peaks in the wilderness rise to over  but none come to within  of approaching the height of Preston Peak. From the summit on a clear day, the Pacific Ocean is visible along with peaks in the Klamath Mountains and Cascade Range.

John Hart, in his book Hiking the Bigfoot Country says of the peak:

Designation 
The Forest Service designated the peak and watershed around the peak the Preston Peak Botanical and Geological Area because of the rare plants and associations of plants that can be found. Here the Alaska cedar and noble fir reach the southern terminus of their range
and share habitat with the northwest California endemic Brewer spruce and Port Orford cedar. There is also an interesting population of high-elevation Pacific yew on the peak that, along with a few other populations in the Klamath Mountains, may justify reclassification as at least a subspecies.
A few other rare plants living on or around the peak are the phantom orchid and Siskiyou fritillary.

References

External links 

 
 
 
 

Klamath Mountains
Mountains of Siskiyou County, California
Mountains of Northern California